Conophytum wettsteinii is a species of flowering plant in the genus Conophytum, native to the northwest Cape Provinces of South Africa. It has gained the Royal Horticultural Society's Award of Garden Merit.

Subtaxa
The following subspecies are currently accepted:
Conophytum wettsteinii subsp. fragile (Tischer) S.A.Hammer
Conophytum wettsteinii subsp. francoiseae S.A.Hammer
Conophytum wettsteinii subsp. ruschii (Schwantes) S.A.Hammer

References

wettsteinii
Endemic flora of South Africa
Flora of the Cape Provinces
Plants described in 1922
Taxa named by N. E. Brown
Taxa named by Alwin Berger